The 2018 Texas Senate elections took place as part of the biennial United States elections. Texas voters elected state senators in 15 of the state senate's 31 districts. State senators serve four-year terms in the Texas State Senate. A statewide map of Texas's state Senate districts can be obtained from the Texas Legislative Council here, and individual district maps can be obtained from the U.S. Census here.

A primary election on March 6, 2018, determined which candidates appeared on the November 6 general election ballot. Primary election results can be obtained from the Texas Secretary of State's website.

Following the 2016 state senate elections, Republicans maintained effective control of the Senate with 20 members. However, they gained an extra seat by flipping the 19th District in the August 2018 special election.

To claim control of the chamber from Republicans, the Democrats would have needed to net six Senate seats. The Democratic Party gained two seats, leaving the Republicans with a 19 to 12 majority in the chamber.

Summary of race results

Retirements
One incumbent did not run for re-election in 2020:

Republican
 District 8: Van Taylor is running for U.S House of Texas's 3rd district.

Seats gained in preceding special elections

Republicans 
District 19: Pete Flores defeated Pete Gallego in a preceding special election on September 18, 2018 to flip this seat. The seat was vacated by Carlos Uresti, who resigned after multiple convictions on fraud and laundering charges.

Incumbents defeated

In the primary election

Republicans
District 30: Craig Estes lost to Pat Fallon.

In the general election

Republicans
District 10: Konni Burton lost to Beverly Powell.
District 16: Don Huffines lost to Nathan M. Johnson.

Close races

Summary of results by State Senate District
Race results:

Source:
Note: For districts not displayed re-election not scheduled until 2020.

Detailed results by State Senate District

Sources:

District 2

District 3

District 5

District 7

District 8

District 9

District 10

District 14

District 15

District 16

District 17

District 19

District 23

District 25

District 30

District 31

See also
United States elections, 2018
United States Senate election in Texas, 2018
United States House of Representatives elections in Texas, 2018
Texas gubernatorial election, 2018
2018 Texas House of Representatives election
Texas elections, 2018

References

2018 Texas elections
Texas State Senate elections
Texas State Senate